The 1980–81 FIS Ski Jumping World Cup was the second World Cup season in ski jumping. It began in Oberstdorf, West Germany on 30 December 1980 and finished in Planica, Yugoslavia on 22 March 1981. The individual World Cup was won by Armin Kogler and Nations Cup by Austria.

Map of world cup hosts 
All 19 locations which have been hosting world cup events for men this season. Events in Zakopane and Cortina d'Ampezzo were completely canceled.

 Four Hills Tournament
 Swiss Tournament
 Bohemia Tournament
 KOP International Ski Flying Week

Calendar

Men

Standings

Overall

Nations Cup

Four Hills Tournament

References 

World cup
World cup
FIS Ski Jumping World Cup